Six degrees may refer to:

Six degrees of separation, the theory that anyone on earth can be connected to any other person on the planet through a chain of acquaintances that has no more than five intermediaries
Six degrees of freedom, motion in three-dimensional space, with three translation motions (up/down, left/right, forward/back) and three rotation motions (yaw, pitch, roll)
Six Degrees of Kevin Bacon, a trivia game that requires a group of players to connect any film actor to Kevin Bacon in as few links as possible
SixDegrees.org, a social networking website created by Bacon based on the game, intended to link people to charities
SixDegrees.com, a social networking website from 1997 to 2001
Six Degrees patent, covering patterns on which modern social networking is founded

Books
Six Degrees: The Science of a Connected Age, a science book by Duncan J. Watts, covering the application of network theory to sociology
Six Degrees: Our Future on a Hotter Planet, 2007 book by Mark Lynas, about the impact each single degree increase in temperature could have on our planet over the next century
SixDegrees (magazine), English-language Finnish magazine

Film, television, and drama
Six Degrees (TV series), aka 6°, a 2006 American television series that aired on ABC
6Degrees, aka Six Degrees, a 2012–2015 British/Northern Irish television series that aired on BBC-NI
Six Degrees of Separation (play), a play by American playwright John Guare 
Six Degrees of Separation (film), a 1993 American film adaptation of the Guare play
"Six Degrees of Separation" (Battlestar Galactica), an episode of the television series Battlestar Galactica
Six Degrees of Separation from Lilia Cuntapay, a Philippine independent film
Lonely Planet Six Degrees, an American travel television program

Music
"Six Degrees of Separation" (song), a song by Irish rock band The Script from their album #3
Six Degrees of Inner Turbulence, a full-length studio album by progressive metal band Dream Theater
"Six Degrees of Inner Turbulence" (song), the title track of the aforementioned album
Six Degrees Records, a recording company noted for its catalog of recordings from international musicians and vocalists